Samets - a stream 1.5 km long and 2 m wide, which flows within the village Shmankivtsi, Chortkiv Raion, Ternopil Oblast, flows into the river Nichlavka. Depicted on the map of von Mig of the XVIII century.

There are four ponds and one waterfall on the shores, all of which are man-made.

Strilka Street stretches parallel to the stream.

It originates on the western outskirts of the village, flows to the southeast, bypassing the village. Strilka Street stretches parallel to the stream. It crosses Shevchenko Street and flows into Nichlavka near the bridge.

Legend
The ancients tell the following legend: "Once a gentleman who probably lived in this village was riding a horse-drawn carriage past him, but suddenly the carriage overturned in the swamp and he drowned".

References

Sources
 

Shmankivtsi